Parliamentary elections were held in Nauru on 15 December 1973. As there were no political parties, all candidates ran as independents.

Results
Three incumbent MPs, Victor Eoaeo, Derog Gioura and David Dabwido, lost their seats.

References

Nauru
1973 in Nauru
Elections in Nauru
Non-partisan elections
Election and referendum articles with incomplete results